Louise Frances Hardy (née MacKinnon) (born November 30, 1959) is a Canadian politician. Hardy was a New Democratic Party Member of Parliament for the riding of Yukon from 1997 to 2000. She was a critic for Human Rights, Housing, Citizenship and Immigration, Indian Affairs and Northern Development.

Born in Whitehorse, she was the Yukon's only federal MP so far to have been born in the territory.

She graduated from Yukon College with a diploma in Social Work. She is widowed from Todd Hardy, former leader of the Yukon New Democratic Party.

External links

1959 births
Living people
Members of the House of Commons of Canada from Yukon
New Democratic Party MPs
Politicians from Whitehorse
Women members of the House of Commons of Canada
Women in Yukon politics